Felipe Arantes (born 9 February 1988) is a retired Brazilian mixed martial artist, who competed in the bantamweight and featherweight divisions. A professional MMA competitor since 2008, Arantes mostly fought in Brazil before signing with the UFC.

Mixed martial arts career

Background and early career
Arantes started training in Judo and Tae Kwon Do at 12 years old and Muay Thai when he was 14. He eventually turned to MMA training when he turned 18.

Arantes made his professional MMA debut in May 2008. He competed in events for smaller promotions in his native Brazil (Paranagua Fight, Samurai FC, Full Battle Heroes) and in the United States (Ultimate Warrior Challenge and Urban Conflict Championships) before signing with the UFC. Prior to his UFC debut he had amassed a record of 13 wins, 3 losses and 2 No Contests.

Ultimate Fighting Championship
Arantes officially signed with the UFC in July 2011. He made his promotional debut on 27 August 2011 at UFC 134 against Iuri Alcântara, replacing an injured Antonio Carvalho. He lost to Alcântara via unanimous decision.

In his second UFC bout, Arantes faced Antonio Carvalho on 14 January 2012 at UFC 142. He won the fight via unanimous decision, earning his first UFC victory.

Arantes faced Milton Vieira on 23 June 2012 at UFC 147. The two fought to a split draw.

Arantes faced Godofredo Pepey on 8 June 2013 at UFC on Fuel TV 10. He won the fight via TKO in the first round.

Arantes was expected to face Sam Sicilia on 4 September 2013 at UFC Fight Night 28. However, Sicilia pulled out of the bout and was replaced by Kevin Souza. He lost the fight via split decision.

Arantes faced Maximo Blanco on 15 February 2014 at UFC Fight Night 36. He won the fight via unanimous decision.

Arantes faced Andre Fili on 25 October 2014 at UFC 179. He lost the fight by unanimous decision.

Making his bantamweight debut, Arantes faced Yves Jabouin on 23 August 2015 at UFC Fight Night 74. He won the fight via submission in the first round and also earned a Performance of the Night bonus.

Arantes next faced Jerrod Sanders on 7 July 2016 at UFC Fight Night 90. He won the fight via submission in the second round.

Arantes faced Érik Pérez on 5 November 2016 at The Ultimate Fighter Latin America 3 Finale. Pérez was awarded a split decision victory.

Arantes was briefly linked to a rematch with Iuri Alcântara on 3 June 2017 at UFC 212. However on 11 May, Arantes was pulled from the fight for undisclosed reasons and was replaced by promotional newcomer Brian Kelleher.

Arantes was scheduled to face Luke Sanders on 16 September 2017 at UFC Fight Night 116. However, the fight was scrapped after Arantes fell sick on 14 September from an undisclosed illness.

Arantes faced Josh Emmett in a featherweight bout on 21 October 2017 at UFC Fight Night 118. He lost the fight via unanimous decision.

Arantes faced Song Yadong on 23 June 2018 at UFC Fight Night 132. He lost the fight via knockout in the second round.

On 28 June 2018, Arantes announced his retirement from professional fighting after the loss in UFC Fight Night 132 in Singapore.

Personal life
Arantes is his wife Lucilene have two sons, Theo (born 2016) and David (born 2019).

Championships & accomplishments
Ultimate Fighting Championship
Performance of the Night (One Time) vs. Yves Jabouin

Mixed martial arts record

|-
|Loss
|align=center|18–10–1 (2)
|Song Yadong
|TKO (elbow and punches)
|UFC Fight Night: Cowboy vs. Edwards
|
|align=center|2
|align=center|4:59
|Kallang, Singapore
|
|-   
|Loss
|align=center|18–9–1 (2)
|Josh Emmett
|Decision (unanimous)
|UFC Fight Night: Cerrone vs. Till
|
|align=center|3
|align=center|5:00
|Gdańsk, Poland
|
|-
|Loss
|align=center|18–8–1 (2)
|Érik Pérez
|Decision (split)
|The Ultimate Fighter Latin America 3 Finale: dos Anjos vs. Ferguson
|
|align=center|3
|align=center|5:00
|Mexico City, Mexico
| 
|-
|Win
|align=center|18–7–1 (2)
|Jerrod Sanders
|Submission (armbar)
|UFC Fight Night: dos Anjos vs. Alvarez
|
|align=center|2
|align=center|1:39
|Las Vegas, Nevada, United States
| 
|-
|Win
|align=center|17–7–1 (2)
|Yves Jabouin
|Submission (armbar)
|UFC Fight Night: Holloway vs. Oliveira
|
|align=center|1
|align=center|4:21
|Saskatoon, Saskatchewan, Canada
|
|-
| Loss
|align=center| 16–7–1 (2)
|Andre Fili
|Decision (unanimous)
|UFC 179
|
|align=center|3
|align=center|5:00
|Rio de Janeiro, Brazil
|
|-
| Win
|align=center| 16–6–1 (2)
| Maximo Blanco
| Decision (unanimous)
| UFC Fight Night: Machida vs. Mousasi
| 
|align=center|3
|align=center|5:00
|Jaraguá do Sul, Brazil
|
|-
| Loss
|align=center| 15–6–1 (2)
| Kevin Souza
| Decision (split)
| UFC Fight Night: Teixeira vs. Bader
| 
|align=center|3
|align=center|5:00
|Belo Horizonte, Brazil
|
|-
| Win
|align=center| 15–5–1 (2)
| Godofredo Pepey
| TKO (elbows and punches)
| UFC on Fuel TV: Nogueira vs. Werdum
| 
|align=center|1
|align=center|3:32
| Fortaleza, Brazil
|
|-
| Draw
|align=center| 14–5–1 (2)
| Milton Vieira
| Draw (split)
| UFC 147
| 
|align=center|3
|align=center|5:00
| Belo Horizonte, Brazil
| 
|- 
| Win
|align=center| 14–5 (2)
| Antonio Carvalho
| Decision (unanimous)
| UFC 142
| 
|align=center|3
|align=center|5:00
| Rio de Janeiro, Brazil
| 
|-
| Loss
|align=center| 13–5 (2)
| Iuri Alcântara
| Decision (unanimous)
| UFC 134
| 
|align=center| 3
|align=center| 5:00
|Rio de Janeiro, Brazil
|
|-
| NC
|align=center| 13–4 (2)
| Andy Main
| No Contest (illegal knee)
| Urban Conflict Championships 4: Supremacy
| 
|align=center| 1
|align=center| 4:38
|Morristown, New Jersey, United States
| 
|- 
| Win
|align=center| 13–4 (1)
| Marcelo Dutra
| Submission (rear-naked choke)
| Gold Fight 2
| 
|align=center| 1
|align=center| 4:15
|São Paulo, Brazil
|
|-
| Win
|align=center| 12–4 (1)
| Cemir Silva
| KO (head kick)
| Barueri Combat
| 
|align=center| 1
|align=center| 0:20
|São Paulo, Brazil
| 
|-
| Win
|align=center| 11–4 (1)
| Jason McLean
| Decision (unanimous)	
| Urban Conflict Championships 3: Renegades
| 
|align=center| 3
|align=center| 5:00
|Jersey City, New Jersey, United States
| 
|-
| Win
|align=center| 10–4 (1)
| Sergio Soares
| Decision (unanimous)
| Super Challenge Pro
| 
|align=center| 3
|align=center| 5:00
|São Paulo, Brazil
| 
|-
| Win
|align=center| 9–4 (1)
| Arlinter Rodrigues
| Submission (rear-naked choke)
| ABC - Fight Festival 1
| 
|align=center| 3
|align=center| N/A
|São Paulo, Brazil
| 
|-
| Win
|align=center| 8–4 (1)
| Rodrigo Caporal
| Decision (unanimous)
| Amerad Fighter 1
| 
|align=center| 3
|align=center| 5:00
|São Paulo, Brazil
| 
|-
| Win
|align=center| 7–4 (1)
| Francisco Robert
| TKO (punches)
| Full Heroes Battle 1
| 
|align=center| 2
|align=center| 2:25
|Paranaguá, Brazil
| 
|-
| NC
|align=center| 6–4 (1)
| Lester Caslow
| No Contest (illegal equipment)	
| Respect Is Earned 3: Philly Biker Brawl
| 
|align=center| 3
|align=center| 3:06
|Oaks, Pennsylvania, United States
| 
|-
| Loss
|align=center| 6–4
| Freddy Assuncao
| Decision (unanimous)
| Ultimate Warrior Challenge 7: Redemption
| 
|align=center| 3
|align=center| 5:00
|Fairfax, Virginia, United States
|
|-
| Loss
|align=center| 6–3
| Rony Jason
| Submission (triangle choke)
| Samurai Fight Combat
| 
|align=center| 1
|align=center| 4:53
|Curitiba, Brazil
| 
|-
| Win
|align=center| 6–2
| John Lineker
| Submission (armbar)
| Paranagua Fight 5
| 
|align=center| 1
|align=center| 1:12
|Paranaguá, Brazil
| 
|-
| Win
|align=center| 5–2
| Diego Fortunato
| TKO (punches)
| Paranagua Fight 4
| 
|align=center| 1
|align=center| 2:03
|Paranaguá, Brazil
| 
|-
| Win
|align=center| 4–2
| Rafael Miquelini
| Submission (rear-naked choke)
| Paranagua Fight 4
| 
|align=center| 1
|align=center| 2:20
|Paranaguá, Brazil
| 
|-
| Loss
|align=center| 3–2
| Steve Deangelis
| Decision (unanimous)
| World Cagefighting Alliance: Pure Combat
| 
|align=center| 3
|align=center| 5:00
|Atlantic City, New Jersey, United States
| 
|-
| Win
|align=center| 3–1
| Alexandre Pedroso
| TKO (corner stoppage)
| Paranagua Fight 3
| 
|align=center| 1
|align=center| 1:37
|Paranaguá, Brazil
| 
|-
| Win
|align=center| 2–1
| Felipe Alves
| KO (punches and soccer kicks)
| Paranagua Fight 2
| 
|align=center| 1
|align=center| 0:26
|Paranaguá, Brazil
| 
|-
| Win
|align=center| 1–1
| Adriano Tessaro
| TKO (punches)
| Beach Fight Festival
| 
|align=center| 1
|align=center| 1:43
|São Paulo, Brazil
| 
|-
| Loss
|align=center| 0–1
| Felipe Vidal
| Submission (armbar)
| Real Fight 5
| 
|align=center| 1
|align=center| N/A
|São Paulo, Brazil
|

See also
 List of current UFC fighters
 List of male mixed martial artists

References

External links
 
 

1988 births
Living people
Brazilian male mixed martial artists
Brazilian male judoka
Brazilian male taekwondo practitioners
Brazilian Muay Thai practitioners
Brazilian practitioners of Brazilian jiu-jitsu
Featherweight mixed martial artists
Mixed martial artists utilizing Muay Thai
Mixed martial artists utilizing taekwondo
Mixed martial artists utilizing judo
Mixed martial artists utilizing Brazilian jiu-jitsu
Sportspeople from São Paulo
Ultimate Fighting Championship male fighters